The Highway is a commercial-free country music radio station on Sirius XM channel 56. It was created when Sirius and XM merged their competing hit country stations, "New Country" on Sirius and "Highway 16" on XM. The Highway can also be streamed at SiriusXM.com and through its app for mobile devices. Until February 9, 2010, it was heard on DirecTV channel 814.

The Highway broadcasts from Sirius XM's New York City studios, as well as studios at the Bridgestone Arena in Nashville, Tennessee.

The Highway is among the most popular music channels on satellite radio. As of 2014, SiriusXM reports it has more than 27 million subscribers.

Most Fridays, listeners visiting Nashville are invited to the Jimmy Buffett's Margaritaville Cafe to become a part of the show called the "Music Row Happy Hour"  with Buzz Brainard.

Country music singer, songwriter, and TV personality Kellie Pickler is a Highway radio host, heard weekdays from 11am to 3pm Central time.

The channel spotlights new music through its "Highway Finds" feature. This changed the music business by giving airplay to unsigned and independent artists, creating fresh stars. The channel bypasses the traditional record company lock on the business.

Exclusive programming includes artist "Town Hall" broadcasts with Jason Aldean, Taylor Swift, and Ronnie Dunn, and live concerts with Tim McGraw, Luke Bryan, and The Band Perry.

Hosts
 Storme Warren
 Kellie Pickler
 Buzz Brainard
 Kim Ashley
 Jessica Wade
 Ania Hammar
 Ashley Till
 Al Skop

Specialty shows
 The Highway Hot 30 Weekend Countdown: Hosted by Storme Warren, Weekly countdown show determined by members of "The Highway Patrol," a free club of listeners who rate the music in a special online application. Saturdays at 9am and 5 pm, and Sundays at midnight, 6 am, 1 pm and 9 pm Eastern, with repeats all weekend. 
On the Horizon: Hosted by Buzz Brainard, On the Horizon is a one-hour show that features new songs by up-and-coming artists. Saturdays at 11am and 7 pm, and Sundays 2 am, 8 am, 3 pm and 11 pm Eastern, with repeats all weekend.
Outsiders Radio: Every month, Eric Church picks a theme and shares his favorite music around it plus exclusive behind-the-scenes stories.
 Takin' The Wheel: Celebrity guest DJ takeover the show.
 Highway Hang Time: Artists hang in our studios and preview new music. Can also include live exclusive performances.
 Superfan Concerts: Live performances by stars and up-and-coming artists.
 The Music Row Happy Hour: Buzz Brainard hosts Friday 4 pm Eastern live on location from a bar in Nashville with listeners.

Core Artists

 Florida Georgia Line
 Luke Bryan
 Blake Shelton
 Thomas Rhett
 Kelsea Ballerini
 Dan + Shay
 Keith Urban
 Jason Aldean
 Miranda Lambert
 Maren Morris
 Luke Combs
 Eric Church
 Carrie Underwood
 Dierks Bentley
Old Dominion
Morgan Wallen

References

Sirius Satellite Radio channels
XM Satellite Radio channels
Sirius XM Radio channels
Country radio stations in the United States
Radio stations established in 2008